Hungerwinter may refer to:

 The Dutch famine of 1944
 The famine in occupied Germany in 1947